Askar (Arabic عسكر, 'army'), (Somali Caskar , 'Police') Al askar or Ashkar may refer to:

Places
Askar (camp), a Palestinian refugee camp near Nablus
Al-Askar, the capital of Egypt in 750–868 AD
Askar, Bahrain, a village
Askar, Bangladesh, a village
Aşkar, a village in Azerbaijan
Askar, Iran, a village in Kerman Province
Askar, a fictional ancient mythical civilisation in Robin Jarvis' Wyrd Museum Trilogy

People
Abdimalik Askar (born 1975/1976), a Somali-American educator and politician
Amin Askar (born 1985), an Ethiopian footballer
Attila Aşkar (born 1944), a Turkish civil engineer
Aziz Ben Askar (born 1976), a Moroccan footballer
Mohamed Askar (born 1986), a Sri Lankan cricketer
Osama Askar (born 1957), an Egyptian Army officer

Other uses
Askar Capital, an investment bank in Iceland 2007–2010
Askar, slang for police as used in the UK.

See also

Askari (disambiguation)
Askariyeh
Asgariyeh